Mathieu Karl Maria Ahlersmeyer (29 June 1896 – 23 July 1979) was a German operatic baritone and actor.

Life 
Born in Cologne, Ahlersmeyer took singing and acting lessons with Karl Niemann in Cologne. He gained his first stage experience in Mönchengladbach in 1929; Engagements followed as an opera singer in Berlin, Hamburg (1931–34), Dresden and also abroad. In 1938 he sang the title role in the world premiere of W. Egk's opera Peer Gynt. In the final phase of the Second World War Hitler included him in the Gottbegnadeten list of the most important artists in 1944.

Ahlersmeyer was bombed out in Dresden in 1945, and he went to the Hamburgische Staatsoper, where he was engaged again. His last guest appearance in Hamburg was in 1973. Ahlersmeyer died in Garmisch-Partenkirchen at the age of 83. He is buried at the Partenkirchen cemetery.

He was married to Marcia Otten. The marriage yielded four children.

Filmography 
 1949: The Marriage of Figaro, Part of the Count Almaviva in this DEFA-film adaptation of the opera
 1951: The Dubarry
 1955: Das Fräulein von Scuderi
 1963/1964: Die Reise auf den Mond

Further reading 
 Jürgen Kesting: Charakter-Sänger: Mathieu Ahlersmeyer. In Die großen Sänger, volume 2. Claasen, Düsseldorf 1986, .
 Frank-Burkhard Habel, : Das große Lexikon der DDR-Stars. Die Schauspieler aus Film und Fernsehen. Extended new edition. Schwarzkopf & Schwarzkopf, Berlin 2002, .

References

External links 
 
 

German operatic baritones
20th-century German male opera singers
German male film actors
German male stage actors
1896 births
1979 deaths
Musicians from Cologne